Lake Chudzyavr is a large freshwater lake on the Kola Peninsula in Murmansk Oblast, Russia. The river Chudzyok (left tributary of the Voronya) flows from the lake.

The name of the lake is of Kildin Sami origin.

References

Chudzyavr
LChudzyavr